Adrian Ungur was the defending champion, but was eliminated by Nikola Mektić in the first round.
Attila Balázs won this tournament, by defeating Martin Fischer 7–6(4), 2–6, 6–1 in the final.

Seeds

Draw

Finals

Top half

Bottom half

References
 Main Draw
 Qualifying Draw

Sicilia Classic - Singles
Sicilia Classic